The 2019 season was FC Seoul's 36th season in the K League 1.

Pre-season
 In Guam: From 6 January 2019 to 25 January 2019
 In Kagoshima, Japan: From 30 January 2019 to 22 February 2019

Pre-season match results

Competitions

Overview

K League 1

FA Cup

Match reports and match highlights
Fixtures and Results at FC Seoul Official Website

Season statistics

K League 1 records

All competitions records

Attendance records

 Season total attendance is K League 1, FA Cup, and AFC Champions League combined

Squad statistics

Top 5 Goal Scorers

Top 5 Assist Makers

Coaching staff

Players

Team squad
All players registered for the 2019 season are listed.

Out on loan and military service

Note: Where a player has not declared an international allegiance, nation is determined by place of birth.
※ In: Transferred from other teams in the middle of the season.
※ Out: Transferred to other teams in the middle of the season.
※ Discharged: Transferred from Sanjgu Sangmu or Ansan Mugunghwa for military service in the middle of the season (registered in 2019 season).
※ Conscripted: Transferred to Sangju Sangmu or Ansan Mugunghwa for military service after the end of the season.

Transfers

Tactics

Tactical analysis

Starting eleven and formation

Substitutes

See also
 FC Seoul

References

External links
 FC Seoul official website 

FC Seoul seasons
Seoul